Temple Israel is a historic synagogue  located at Lafayette, Tippecanoe County, Indiana.  Its 1867 building is one of the oldest synagogue buildings in the United States.

The congregation, which was formed in 1849, was the second Jewish congregation organized in Indiana.  In 1874 it became a founding member of the Union of American Hebrew Congregations.  The congregation moved to its third and present location on Cumberland Avenue in West Lafayette.

Historic building
The Temple Israel building of 1866–1867, located at 17 South 7th St., was placed on the National Register of Historic Places in 1982.  It is a two-story Rundbogenstil structure.  The building was dedicated by Rabbi Isaac Mayer Wise.

In 1976 the old synagogue building was purchased from the Red Cross by the Unitarian Universalist Church of Lafayette, Indiana. The UU congregation vacated this location in October 2007.

References

External links
 Synagogue website

National Register of Historic Places in Tippecanoe County, Indiana
Churches completed in 1867
Buildings and structures in Lafayette, Indiana
Former synagogues in Indiana
Unitarian Universalist churches in Indiana
Rundbogenstil synagogues
Founding members of the Union for Reform Judaism
Religious organizations established in 1849
1849 establishments in Indiana
Synagogues on the National Register of Historic Places in Indiana